La Paz is a municipality of the Mexican state of Baja California Sur.  Its area of 20,275 km² (7,828.2 sq mi) makes it the municipality in Mexico with the fourth-largest area.  It had a population of 290,286 inhabitants in the 2015 census.  Its municipal seat, also named La Paz, is the state capital.

Demographics

As of 2015, the municipality had a total population of 290,286.

As of 2015, the city of La Paz had a population of 244,219. Other than the city of La Paz, the municipality had 1,749 localities, the largest of which (with 2015 populations in brackets) were: Todos Santos (6,485), El Centenario (6,068), classified as urban, and El Pescadero (3,151), Chametla (2,734), Colonia Calafia (2,064), Melitón Albáñez Domínguez (2,140), and Los Barriles (1,174), classified as rural.

Government

Municipal presidents

See also

Puerto Balandra, Baja California Sur

References

External links
 Official Ayuntamiento de La Paz website (La Paz Municipality)—

 
Municipalities of Baja California Sur